Bai Li (born 30 March 1996) is a Chinese long-distance runner. She qualified to represent China at the 2020 Summer Olympics in Tokyo 2021, competing in women's marathon.

References

 

1996 births
Living people
Chinese female long-distance runners
Athletes (track and field) at the 2020 Summer Olympics
Olympic athletes of China